Jason Aaron Mills (born May 24, 1992), professionally known as IDK (also known as Jay IDK; a backronym for Ignorantly Delivering Knowledge), is a British-American rapper, singer, songwriter, and record producer.

Early life
Jason Aaron Mills was born on May 24, 1992, in London, England to British-American parents. He was raised in Prince George's County, Maryland, where he later started to make music initially under the moniker IDK.

Career
In August 2015, Mills released his second mixtape, titled SubTrap. The name stands for Suburban Trap or "Trap music with substance." The album features the singles "The Plug," "God Said Trap (King Trappy III)" and "Cookie Addiction" featuring BJ the Chicago Kid. It features production from Skhye Hutch, was mixed by Lo Mein, Tim Webberson, Matt Weiss, and Delbert Bowers. Project management for Subtrap was overseen by Blade Thornton, David Kuti, Clayton Barmore, Quinelle Holder, and Ryan Booth. Mills' style of rapping has been compared to the early work of Kendrick Lamar, especially Lamar's 2011 album Section.80.

On June 22, 2016, Mills was announced as one of the performers at the 2016 Trillectro Music Festival. On September 9, 2016, Mills released his third mixtape Empty Bank and premiered it on Forbes.  Mills opened for Isaiah Rashad on his "The Lil Sunny" tour which started in January 2017.

On October 13, 2017, Mills released his fourth mixtape IWasVeryBad.

On September 4, 2019, Mills released his debut studio album, Is He Real.

On July 9, 2021, Mills released his second studio album, USEE4YOURSELF.

On April 29, 2022, Mills opened for Zedd at Washington University in St. Louis as part of WILD.

On May 1, 2022, Mills performed at Swarthmore College as part of Worthstock.

On May 6, 2022, Mills released his third studio album, Simple.

Mills' song Dog Food was featured on the soundtrack for the 2022 video game FIFA 23.

Discography

Studio albums

Mixtapes

Guest appearances

References

1992 births
Living people
American hip hop musicians
People from Prince George's County, Maryland
African-American male rappers
21st-century American rappers
21st-century American male musicians
Warner Records artists
21st-century African-American musicians
Trap musicians